Emmaus was an ancient town in Judaea mentioned in the Gospel of Luke.

Emmaus may also refer to:

Places
 Emmaus Nicopolis, an archaeological site in Israel
 Imwas, a Palestinian Arab village formerly located at the site
 Emmaus (Diocese), an ancient and titular diocese of the Roman Catholic Church
 Emmaus, Pennsylvania, United States
 Emmaus, U.S. Virgin Islands, United States

Institutions
 Emmaus Bible College (Australia) in Epping, Australia
 Emmaus Bible College (Iowa) in Dubuque, Iowa
 Emmaus (charity), a homeless charity
 Emmaus College (disambiguation), several schools
 Emmaus High School, Emmaus, Pennsylvania
 Emmaus Monastery in Prague, Czech Republic

Events
 Battle of Emmaus, 166 BC
 Plague of Emmaus, 639
 Road to Emmaus appearance, one of the early resurrection appearances of Jesus
 Walk to Emmaus, a Methodist adult ministry similar to the Catholic Cursillo

See also
 Supper at Emmaus (disambiguation)